Turkmen Agricultural University Named After S.A. Nyýazow is the largest higher education institution in Turkmenistan. This university only provides studies in the fields of agriculture. It is named after Saparmyrat Nyýazow, Turkmenistan's first president.

History 
In 1930, the Agricultural Institute was constructed in the capital city of Ashgabat. Until 1998, the institution was named after Mikhail Kalinin. In 1998, was awarded university status, and had a name change. In 2012, the training center CLAAS was opened.

Faculties 
The university consists of 8 departments:

 Agronomy
 Agricultural mechanisation
 Textile production
 Processing of agricultural products
 Veterinary
 Hydromelioration
 Agroecology
 Economics and management of agriculture

Alumni 
 Annamurat Soltanov, Chief of General Staff of the Armed Forces of Turkmenistan
 Esenmyrat Orazgeldiýew, former Agriculture Minister of Turkmenistan
 Serdar Berdimuhamedow, President of Turkmenistan

References 

Universities in Turkmenistan
Buildings and structures in Ashgabat
1930 establishments in the Soviet Union
Buildings and structures built in the Soviet Union
Education in the Soviet Union
Education in Turkmenistan
Educational organizations based in Turkmenistan
Educational institutions established in 1930
Saparmyrat Nyýazow